Gamawan Fauzi (born 9 November 1957) is an Indonesian politician. He served as Minister of Home Affairs between 2009 and 2014, and as Governor of West Sumatra between 2005 and 2009.

Career
Fauzi was the Minister of Home Affairs in the Second United Indonesia Cabinet and head of the Department of Home Affairs in the Second United Indonesia Cabinet. He was the first non military individual that held the position since PNI cadre, Sanusi, in the late 1950s. He holds a bachelor's degree from the Andalas University School of Law in Padang. He won the Bung Hatta Award for his efforts to battle corruption. Despite having been supported by the Indonesian Democratic Party – Struggle in his successful election campaign for the governorship of West Sumatra, he supported Susilo Bambang Yudhoyono of the rival Democrat Party in the 2009 Indonesian presidential election. 
He achieved the ideals ambitions commonly held by a civil service by having experiences to designated as a Regent, a Governor and finally a Minister of Home Affairs . “I am among the lucky officer. During the past 10 years, I experienced the era of five presidents since Suharto era until Yudhoyono."

References

1957 births
Living people
People from Solok
Interior ministers of Indonesia
Governors of West Sumatra
Minangkabau people
Andalas University alumni